Diplotaxis frondicola is a species of May beetle or junebug in the family Scarabaeidae. It is found in North America.

Further reading

References

External links

 

Melolonthinae
Articles created by Qbugbot
Beetles described in 1825